Apatani may refer to:
Apatani people
Apatani language

Language and nationality disambiguation pages